5-Bromouridine (abbreviated BrUrd, 5BrU, br5Urd or rarely the one letter code B) is a uridine derivative with a bromo substituent at the fifth carbon. BrUrd is incorporated into RNA and can be detected immunocytochemically and analysed by cytometry. It causes DNA damage through base substitution and increases the number of mutations.

Uses

Detecting half-Life activity
5-Bromouridine has also been used to detect the half-life of RNA molecules. In a method called 5'-bromo-uridine immunoprecipitation chase-deep sequencing analysis (BRIC-seq), 5'-bromouridine is used to label RNA and enable the measurement of RNA levels over time. This method was used in Tani et al.'s study determining RNA half-lives to investigate the function of non-coding RNAs.

Splicing of pre-mRNA
5-Bromouridine was also used to study in vitro splicing of pre-mRNA in a study by Wansink. 5-Bromoruridine 5'-triphosphate (BruUTP) was used to label pre-mRNA and investigate the efficiency of splicing. They found that splicing is inhibited if uridines in RNA transcript were replaced by BrU, which suggested that Us were critical for the splicing reaction.

Detection of RNA synthesis in individual cells
Incorporation of 5-bromouridine by individual cells was detected immunocytochemically using antibodies against BrdU followed by flow cytometry.

See also
 5-Bromouracil
 Bromodeoxyuridine

References

External links
 

Antiretroviral drugs
Nucleosides
Organobromides
Pyrimidinediones
Hydroxymethyl compounds